Park Sang-min (born May 2, 1964) is a South Korean rock singer. In 2004, he received the SBS Gayo Daejeon.

Filmography

Television show 
 King of Mask Singer (MBC, 2017) – Contestant as "Are You Mask King, Jenga?" (episodes 99 and 100)

Ambassadorship 
 Public Relations Ambassador '2022 Boryeong Marine Mud Expo (2022)

References

External links

1964 births
Living people
South Korean male singers
South Korean rock singers
South Korean television personalities
Hongik University alumni
South Korean Buddhists